Kureh Bar (also Romanized as Kūreh Bar and Kūrehbar) is a village in Ahandan Rural District, in the Central District of Lahijan County, Gilan Province, Iran. At the 2006 census, its population was 216, in 59 families.

References 

Populated places in Lahijan County